State Route 177 (SR 177), also known as College Avenue, is a  route in Jackson in the southwestern part of the state.  Both its southern and northern termini are at separate intersections with US 43 in Jackson.

Route description
Prior to 1970, US 43 passed through Jackson.  With the completion of a by-pass to the west of the city, US 43 was moved to the new roadway, and SR 177 was designated along the former U.S. Highway.  SR 177 also serves as the southern terminus of SR 69, one of the longest state routes in Alabama.

Major intersections

References

External links

177
Transportation in Clarke County, Alabama
U.S. Route 43